is a Japanese badminton player from Tonami Transportation badminton team. In 2013, he and his men's doubles partner Hirokatsu Hashimoto, received the Badminton Nippon League's Valuable Player Award. He competed at the 2010 and 2014 Asian Games.

Achievements

Asian Championships 
Men's doubles

Mixed doubles

BWF Superseries 
The BWF Superseries, which was launched on 14 December 2006 and implemented in 2007, was a series of elite badminton tournaments, sanctioned by the Badminton World Federation (BWF). BWF Superseries levels were Superseries and Superseries Premier. A season of Superseries consisted of twelve tournaments around the world that had been introduced since 2011. Successful players were invited to the Superseries Finals, which were held at the end of each year.

Men's doubles

  BWF Superseries Finals tournament
  BWF Superseries Premier tournament
  BWF Superseries tournament

BWF Grand Prix 
The BWF Grand Prix had two levels, the Grand Prix and Grand Prix Gold. It was a series of badminton tournaments sanctioned by the Badminton World Federation (BWF) and played between 2007 and 2017.

Men's doubles

  BWF Grand Prix Gold tournament
  BWF Grand Prix tournament

BWF International Challenge/Series 
Men's doubles

Mixed doubles

  BWF International Challenge tournament
  BWF International Series tournament

Record against selected opponents 
Men's doubles results with Hirokatsu Hashimoto against Super Series finalists, Worlds Semi-finalists, and Olympic quarterfinalists.

  Cai Yun & Fu Haifeng 0–4
  Chai Biao & Guo Zhendong 1–3
  Guo Zhendong & Xu Chen 0–2
  Chai Biao & Hong Wei 0–2
  Liu Xiaolong & Qiu Zihan 1–2
  Fang Chieh-min & Lee Sheng-mu 2–6
  Lee Sheng-mu & Tsai Chia-hsin 1–3
  Mathias Boe & Carsten Mogensen 0–5
  Markis Kido & Hendra Setiawan 2–3
  Angga Pratama & Rian Agung Saputro 4–1
  Muhammad Ahsan & Bona Septano 0–1
  Muhammad Ahsan & Hendra Setiawan 0–2
  Hiroyuki Endo & Kenichi Hayakawa 0–4
  Jung Jae-sung & Lee Yong-dae 0–2
  Ko Sung-hyun & Yoo Yeon-seong 2–4
  Ko Sung-hyun & Lee Yong-dae 0–3
  Lee Yong-dae & Yoo Yeon-seong 0–1
  Mohd Zakry Abdul Latif & Mohd Fairuzizuan Mohd Tazari 1–0
  Koo Kien Keat & Tan Boon Heong 2–2
  Goh V Shem & Lim Khim Wah 2–1
  Bodin Isara & Maneepong Jongjit 0–1
  Howard Bach & Tony Gunawan 0–2

References

External links 
 

1983 births
Living people
Sportspeople from Toyama Prefecture
Japanese male badminton players
Badminton players at the 2010 Asian Games
Badminton players at the 2014 Asian Games
Asian Games competitors for Japan
21st-century Japanese people